Diplognatha is a genus of beetle belonging to the family Scarabaeidae, Cetoniinae subfamily.

Description
Species of this genus are of medium size (approx. 20–27 mm). The body is slightly oblong and flat, with a shiny surface, usually black or brown, but some species have a distinct metallic sheen. A sexual dimorphism is barely visible. The larvae usually live in the soil, but some species are supposed to develop in bird and bee nests. In some species, the adult beetles live for several years, which is relatively uncommon.

Distribution 
These beetles live in tropical Africa. The species Diplognatha gagates is found almost everywhere in Africa south of Sahara.

List of species

 Diplognatha blanchardi Schaum, 1844
 Diplognatha crampeli Fairmaire, 1893
 Diplognatha gagates (Forster, 1771)
 Diplognatha gagates silicea Macleay, 1838
 Diplognatha inaequalis Schürhoff, 1942
 Diplognatha jeanneli Bourgoin, 1913
 Diplognatha mhondana Moser, 1901
 Diplognatha montana Kolbe, 1892
 Diplognatha pagana Harold, 1879
 Diplognatha preussi Kolbe, 1892
 Diplognatha pupurascens (Fabricius, 1801)
 Diplognatha striata Janson, 1877
 Diplognatha subaenea Duvivier, 1891
 Diplognatha viridichalcea Kolbe, 1897
 Diplognatha viridula Janson, 1878

References

 Eol
 Flower-beetles
 Diplognatha gagates
 Diplognatha silicea

Cetoniinae